Teen Titans: Trouble in Tokyo is a 2006 American made-for-TV animated superhero film adaptation of the DC Comics superhero team Teen Titans. It is set in the milieu of the animated series Teen Titans that ran on Cartoon Network from 2003 to 2006, with the film serving as the series finale. It premiered on Cartoon Network, Friday, September 15, 2006 and premiered on Kids' WB the following day. Teen Titans head writer David Slack wrote the movie.

Plot
The Teen Titans's hometown, Jump City, is attacked by a Japanese ninja called Saico-Tek. They capture him and discover Saico-Tek was sent by a man called "Brushogun" before he mysteriously vanishes after triggering the tower's fire sprinklers. Subsequently, the Titans head to Tokyo, Japan, to search for his master. Upon arriving there, after overcoming the language barrier and fighting a Gorgo-like giant reptile, the Titans meet Tokyo's own supernatural defense force—the Tokyo Troopers—led by Commander Uehara Daizo. When questioned on Brushogun, Daizo claims that Brushogun is nothing more than an urban legend. Left with no villains to pursue, the Titans decide to enjoy Tokyo.

Robin and Starfire express their feelings for each other until Robin starts to focus on Brushogun again and declares they cannot be anything more than heroes, upsetting Starfire. Investigating alone, Robin is attacked by Saico-Tek and ends up pummeling the ninja into the ground. When Saico-Tek does not rise, Robin is apprehended by Daizo for killing him. Elsewhere, Starfire is approached and comforted by a little girl, which helps to overcome her depression and makes her realize that despite Robin's earlier objections, their romantic feelings for each other are indeed truly mutual.

Just then, the Mayor of Tokyo announces Robin's arrest and orders that the other Teen Titans must either turn themselves in or leave Tokyo. Starfire calls the other Titans, but as they attempt to regroup, Brushogun sends out his minions to destroy the Titans. Meanwhile, as Robin is being transferred to a more secure facility, a slip of paper bearing the name "Brushogun" fits into the armored car carrying him and explodes, freeing him. Robin co-opts the identity of a Shinjuku mugger to collect information that Brushogun is in fact real. He is eventually found by the Tokyo Troopers, which leads to a car chase. Robin is surrounded when Starfire comes to his rescue and takes him to a shrine (where they attempt to kiss again until they are suddenly interrupted by Cyborg, Raven, and Beast Boy's arrival). There, Raven relates from a book she found that Brushogun was an artist who dreamed of bringing his beloved drawings to life using dark magic. The spell ultimately turned against the young artist, and he was transformed into Brushogun, a being of paper and ink capable to bring any creation he could imagine to life, until he suddenly disappeared. Robin realizes that he did not kill Saico-Tek because he was an ink-made creature, and he was set up to make him look like a criminal.

The Titans track Brushogun to a comic book publishing factory, where they discover Brushogun trap-wired into a cursed printing press that taps into his powers to create the enemies the Titans have faced. He reveals that he had sent the first Saico-Tek to the Titans to summon them to Tokyo, in order to stop the real culprit who had enslaved him. The said culprit is revealed to be Daizo, who used Brushogun's power to create both his Tokyo Troopers and the monsters that they captured in order to gain a reputation as a hero.

Daizo drops in on the Titans and forces Brushogun to create an army of animated ink minions. A mass battle ensues, culminating in Robin facing Daizo. With no options of escape left, Daizo jumps into the ink reservoir of the press, taking control of Brushogun's magic and transforming himself into a hulking mass of ink and machinery, with Brushogun at the center. As the other Titans battle the creatures Daizo hurls at them, Robin frees Brushogun, causing Daizo to lose control of his power and burst. Brushogun dies peacefully in Robin's arms, dissipating his powers and defeating Daizo. With the battle concluded, Robin and Starfire finally confess their feelings and share their first true kiss.

Later on, with Robin's name cleared and Daizo sent to prison, the Titans are awarded medals of honour by the mayor and Tokyo's citizens for their heroic actions. Robin and Starfire are holding hands, confirming they’ve become an official couple. Beast Boy asks Robin if they have to go home, but Robin allows the Titans to stay in Tokyo a little longer to enjoy a well-earned vacation. Beast Boy says that he wants to go to Mexico for their next vacation, causing Raven to slap him.

As the end credits roll, the Titans sing a literally translated version of their Japanese theme song in celebration for the defeat of Daizo and their award ceremony.

Voice cast
 Scott Menville as Richard "Dick" Grayson / Robin and Japanese Boy
 Hynden Walch as Princess Koriand'r / Starfire and Mecha-Boi
 Tara Strong as Rachel Roth / Raven and Computer Voice
 Greg Cipes as Garfield Logan / Beast Boy
 Khary Payton as Victor Stone / Cyborg
 Cary-Hiroyuki Tagawa as Brushogun
 Keone Young as Commander Uehara Daizo, Saico-Tek and Sushi Shop Owner
 Robert Ito as Bookstore Owner and Mayor
 Janice Kawaye as Nya-Nya and Timoko
 Yuri Lowenthal as Japanese Biker and Scarface

Reception 
Teen Titans: Trouble in Tokyo received generally positive reviews from critics.

Filip Vukcevic of IGN said in his review, "Something's missing here. Teen Titans the television show is a fun, vibrant series that's a lot more entertaining than it looks. Following the show's recent cancellation, it seems like Trouble in Tokyo is the last we'll get of our intrepid heroes. Unfortunately, as a swan song or otherwise, when squeezed Teen Titans: Trouble in Tokyo reveals itself for what it really is: a suspiciously average direct-to-DVD movie that looks good, but doesn't do anything to conceal the fact that underneath it's fake."

Rafe Telsch of Cinema Blend wrote, "Teen Titans: Trouble in Tokyo is a decent follow up for the cancelled series that should make fans happy to see their favorite characters again, although a few of the characters seem to get the shaft on screen time."

Soundtrack release
A soundtrack to the movie was released on July 22, 2008 through La-La-Land Records. The track listing is as follows.

Home media
The DVD release date was February 6, 2007. The special features included are "The Lost Episode", featuring the villain Punk Rocket, and a game entitled Robin's Underworld Race Challenge. Trouble in Tokyo was also released on Blu-ray through the Warner Archive Collection on December 3, 2019.

Sequel
A stand-alone sequel serving as a crossover between Teen Titans and its successor series entitled Teen Titans Go! vs. Teen Titans premiered at San Diego Comic-Con 2019 in July, followed by digital release on September 24 and physical release on October 15.

References

External links 

 

2000s American animated films
2000s animated superhero films
2006 television films
2006 films
American animated television films
American children's animated adventure films
American children's animated action films
American children's animated fantasy films
American children's animated superhero films
American fantasy adventure films
Animated films about extraterrestrial life
Animated films based on animated series
Animated films based on DC Comics
American television series finales
Anime-influenced Western animation
Demons in film
Animated films set in Tokyo
Teen Titans films
Teen Titans (TV series)
Japan in non-Japanese culture
2000s English-language films